TVP3 Kielce is a regional branch of the TVP, Poland's public television broadcaster, with the registered office located in Kielce. It serves Kielce and the entire Świętokrzyskie Voivodeship.

Own programs

TVP3 Kielce is broadcasting own programmes into composition which news programmes are accessing from the region, press, cultural-scientific, community and entertaining programs:

 "Informacje" (Information) - main news bulletin giving to the message from Kielce and of Region
 "Bez Demagogii" (Without the Demagoguery) - weekly program with the participation of politicians and leaders of political parties
 "R jak Reportaż" (R like the documentary) - program in which ordinary people and his problems, but also his passions and initiatives are a hero.
 "7 Minut" (7 Minutes) - interview concerning the current situation in the city and the region.
 "Studio Balkon" (Studio Balcony) - morning feature programme.
 "Magazyn kulturalny Słup" (Cultural magazine Pole) - a cultural magazine is presenting, comments and cultural announcements from the Świętokrzyskie Voivodeship.
 "Czas na zdrowie" (Time for the health) - program for enthusiasts of a healthy lifestyle.

Broadcast area 
TVP3 Kielce is transmitted throughout Świętokrzyskie Voivodeship and in parts of the adjacent voivodeships.
The transmitter of 150 kW situated on top of Święty Krzyż mountain broadcasts the signal within a radius of 150 kilometres.

Digital terrestrial transmitters MUX 3 in Świętokrzyskie Voivodeship

Logo history

References
http://www.tvp.pl/kielce/o-tvp-kielce/wymagania-techniczne-materialow-w-formacie-sd-do-emisji/13881235
http://www.tvp.pl/kielce/o-tvp-kielce/zasieg-tvp-kielce/9763545

External links 
 
http://www.przelaczenie.eu/mapy/swietokrzyskie

Telewizja Polska
Television channels and stations established in 2005
Mass media in Kielce